The cinema of Kyrgyzstan is part of the cinema of Central Asia.

History
In 1998, Beshkempir, by Aktan Abdykalykov, won the Best Film Grand Prix at the 1st Eurasia International Film Festival, in Almaty, Kazakhstan. In 2005, at the 2nd Eurasia IFF, Saratan, by Ernest Abdyzhapparov, won the Special Jury Prize. In 2008, at the 5th Eurasia IFF, Unknown Route, by Temir Birnazarov, won the Special Feature Film Jury Award; Bridge, by Tina Ibragimov, and Debt, by Temir Birnazarov, won the Special Short Film Jury Award; Bolotbek Zhamshiev won the An Outstanding Contribution to World Cinema Art development award.

Films

Directors
Ernest Abdyzhapparov
Aktan Abdykalykov
Gennadi Bazarov
Temir Birnazarov
Izya Gershtein
Tina Ibragimov
Bakyt Karagulov
Janysh Kulmambetov
Tolomush Okeyev
Bolotbek Zhamshiev

Studios
Kyrgyzfilm

References